The men's bantamweight (54 kg/118.8 lbs) K-1 category at the W.A.K.O. World Championships 2007 in Belgrade was the lightest of the K-1 tournaments and the smallest, involving just four fighters from two continents (Europe and Africa).  Each of the matches was three rounds of two minutes each and were fought under K-1 rules.

The tournament gold medallist was Portugal's Fernando Machado who defeated Aliaksei Papou from Belarus in the final.  The two other fighters at the event, Azamat Murzabekov from Russia and Amine Alaoui M'Hamdi from Morocco, were awarded bronze medals.

Results

See also
List of WAKO Amateur World Championships
List of WAKO Amateur European Championships
List of male kickboxers

References

External links
 WAKO World Association of Kickboxing Organizations Official Site

Kickboxing events at the WAKO World Championships 2007 Belgrade
2007 in kickboxing
Kickboxing in Serbia